Katharina Himmler  (born 6 June 1975) is a German snowboarder. 

She was born in  Munich. She competed at the 2006 Winter Olympics, in snowboard cross. She competed in the parallel giant slalom at the 2002 Winter Olympics.

References

External links 
 

1975 births
Living people
Sportspeople from Munich
German female snowboarders
Olympic snowboarders of Germany
Snowboarders at the 2002 Winter Olympics
Snowboarders at the 2006 Winter Olympics
21st-century German women